Scopelodes venosa is a moth of the family Limacodidae first described by Francis Walker in 1855. It is found in Sri Lanka, China, India, northern Myanmar, northern Thailand, northern Laos, Vietnam and Nepal.

The caterpillar is yellowish green and its body is semiovoid, flat dorsally. There are diamond-shaped markings with dark green edges on its dorsum. Black lines run on most lateral ridges on segments. The tip of lateral tubercle is jet black.

A single subspecies is recorded - Scopelodes venosa kwangtungensis Hering, 1931.

References

External links
Preliminary study on the nuclear polyhedrosis virus of Scopelodes venosa kwangtungensis Hering
Glycerol uptake in the neuroendocrine system of two slug moth prepupae (Lepidoptera)

Moths of Asia
Moths described in 1855
Limacodidae